Moussa Camara (born 27 November 1998) is a Guinean footballer who plays as a goalkeeper for Horoya AC and the Guinea national team.

Club career
Camara played with FC Kolombada in the lower divisions before moving to second-tier club Milo FC. He joined Horoya AC in 2015, serving as backup to the veteran Khadim N'Diaye. He also got to train under goalkeepers coach Kémoko Camara.

After injuries to N'Diaye and Germain Berthé, he made his continental debut in the 2018–19 CAF Champions League against eventual champions ES Tunis, impressing despite giving up two goals in the loss.

International career
At youth level, Camara has been capped at the under-17, under-20 and under-23 levels. He was first called up to the U17s by manager Hamidou Camara, and was his first-choice keeper at the 2015 African U-17 Championship and the 2015 FIFA U-17 World Cup. Two years later he represented his country at the 2017 Africa U-20 Cup of Nations and the 2017 FIFA U-20 World Cup. He also played all six matches for the Guinea U23s during 2019 Africa U-23 Cup of Nations qualification. In the first leg of their third round matchup against Ivory Coast, he saved a penalty in the 83rd minute to preserve a 1–0 win in Abidjan.

He made his senior debut for Guinea on 15 July 2017, appearing between the sticks in their 3–1 win over Guinea-Bissau during 2018 African Nations Championship qualification. In May 2019 he was pre-selected for the 2019 Africa Cup of Nations, but did not make the final squad. Later that year he was called up for 2021 Africa Cup of Nations qualification, playing in both Group A matches against Mali and Namibia before the tournament was postponed due to the COVID-19 pandemic. He later cited Naby Keïta as a teammate he learned a lot from.

Career statistics

Honours
Horoya AC
 Guinée Championnat National: 2015–16, 2016–17, 2017–18, 2018–19
 Guinée Coupe Nationale: 2016, 2018, 2019
 Guinée Super Coupe: 2017, 2018

References

External links
 
 

Living people
1998 births
People from Siguiri
Guinean footballers
Association football goalkeepers
Guinea international footballers
Guinea youth international footballers
Guinea under-20 international footballers
2021 Africa Cup of Nations players
Guinée Championnat National players
Horoya AC players
Guinea A' international footballers
2020 African Nations Championship players